Zainul Abideen (born 31 October 1993) is an ultramarathon runner from Moradabad district Uttar Pradesh, India. He is popularly known as Moradabad Express. 
He is first Indian 12 Hour Ultra Marathon Runner On Manual Treadmill For Guinness Book Of World Records in Moradabad. This run held in mid city of Moradabad in general public this run is dedicated to police & charity run for Philip memorial Methodist church, pili kothi. The record for completing the Golden Triangle on foot was also set by Abideen. He started his journey on July 24, 2018, from New Delhi and finished on July 31, 2018, at India Gate, New Delhi, covering 720 km in 7 days, 22 hours and 50 minutes spreading awareness for 'Run for Women Safety Against Acid/Rape Attack'. In September 2018, he ran 120 kilometres (75 miles) in 23 hours 16 minutes in Kargil, India and finish with podium Tiger Hill challenge. In ultramarathon overall 643 km covered so far in official ultramarathon events across nation as per DUV Ultramarathon stats & 310 km as per ITRA stats in Trail running.

Social cause ultramarathon runs 
• Ram Ganga Tiranga Run (555 km) Prayagraj to Moradabad under aegis of Namami Gange Programme
National Mission For Clean Ganga Ministry of Jal Shakti also approved as Longest Tiranga Run of India by "India book of Record" 

• Run For Police (12 Hour Manual Treadmill Run) It is 1st Indian attempt of 12 hour ultra marathon on manual treadmill for official Guinness Book of World Records.

• 100 km lockdown ultra run (Run For Police & corona warriors) for Parivartan NGO recorded by UP Book Of Records.

•  Run For Make love Not Scars ( Against acid /rape attack ) Delhi to Agra to Jaipur to Delhi ( Golden Triangle of India ) in 7 days 22 hours recorded by India Book Of Records.

• Run Bhopal Run ( For Organ donation )

• Run For Ganga Water ( 12 hour stadium run ) Bengaluru N.E.B stadium run.

• Run For Jesus Mission 100 km "The Border run Hell Race"
( Laungewala to Jaisalmer )

• Run For Army 120 km "Kargil International Marathon" (Tiger Hill Challenge)

• Run For Astittva  Foundation ( NGO for Children Education ) 12 hour Tuffman National Stadium Run Chandigarh.

• Relay Run For Women Empowerment 
Gwalior to New Delhi 375 km in association with BJP awarded by (Mrs Smriti Irani, Dinesh Sharma (politician), Rajasthan Cm Mrs Vasundra Raje,& Mrs.Reeta Bahugune )

References

External links
Zainul's Facebook
 Zainul's Instagram
Zainul Abideen UTMB RESULTS
 Zainul Abideen's Twitter
Zainul Abideen's International Trailrunning Association (ITRA) Race Results
Zainul Abideen's International Deutsche ultra marathon stat's
Zainul Bicycle Mayor

Living people
1993 births
Indian ultramarathon runners
Indian male long-distance runners
Male ultramarathon runners
People from Moradabad
Moradabad
Moradabad district